The 1999–2000 Euroleague Women was the fourth edition of the Euroleague era of FIBA's premier international competition for European women's basketball clubs. It ran between 22 September 1999 and 6 April 2000.

Defending champion and Final Four host MBK Ruzomberok won its second title beating former champion Bourges Basket in the final. BK Brno and Dynamo Moscow also reached the Final Four.

Group stage

Group A

Group B

Quarter-finals

Final four
 Ruzomberok, Slovakia

Individual statistics

Points

Rebounds

Assists

References

EuroLeague Women seasons